The Rating (Empty Properties) Act 2007 (c 9) is an Act of the Parliament of the United Kingdom. It implements recommendations of the Barker Review of Land Use Planning and the Lyons Inquiry into Local Government, and proposals in the report Budget 2007: Building Britain's long-term future: Prosperity and fairness for families.

Section 1 - Unoccupied hereditaments: chargeable amount
Section 1(1) substitutes new sections 45(4) to 45(4B) for the existing section 45(4) of the Local Government Finance Act 1988.

Section 1(2) inserts section 45A of that Act.

Section 1(3) inserts section 143(3B) of that Act.

References
Halsbury's Statutes,

External links
The Rating (Empty Properties) Act 2007, as amended from the National Archives.
The Rating (Empty Properties) Act 2007, as originally enacted from the National Archives.
Explanatory notes to the Rating (Empty Properties) Act 2007.

United Kingdom Acts of Parliament 2007